The United States Department of the Air Force (DAF) is one of the three military departments within the Department of Defense of the United States of America. The Department of the Air Force was formed on September 18, 1947, per the National Security Act of 1947 (codified into Title 10 of the United States Code) and it is the military department within which the United States Air Force and the United States Space Force are organized.

The Department of the Air Force is headed by the Secretary of the Air Force (SAF/OS), a civilian, who has the authority to conduct all of its affairs, subject to the authority, direction and control of the Secretary of Defense. The Secretary of the Air Force's principal deputy is the Under Secretary of the Air Force (SAF/US). Their senior staff assistants in the Office of the Secretary of the Air Force are five Assistant Secretaries for Acquisition, Financial Management & Comptroller, Installations, Environment & Logistics, Manpower & Reserve Affairs, Space Acquisition and Integration and a General Counsel. The highest-ranking military officers in the department, and senior military advisers to the secretary, are the Chief of Staff of the Air Force and Chief of Space Operations.

By direction of the Secretary of Defense, the Secretary of the Air Force assigns Air Force and Space Force units – apart from those units performing duties enumerated in  unless otherwise directed – to the combatant commands. Only the Secretary of Defense and the President have the authority to approve a transfer of forces between combatant commands.

Proposed redesignations

As the Department of the Aerospace Force
In 1981, Congressman Ken Kramer introduced legislation to rename the Department of the Air Force as the Department of the Aerospace Force, along with renaming the United States Air Force as the United States Aerospace Force, to reorient the service and department from an air force to an aerospace force. The legislation would also have established a space command within the Aerospace Force and renamed the Air National Guard to the Aerospace National Guard. The legislation was cosponsored by Representatives G. William Whitehurst, Ike Skelton, and Robin Beard of the United States House Committee on Armed Services. Although the legislation was supported by General James E. Hill, who commanded North American Aerospace Defense Command and Aerospace Defense Command, the Air Force did not support the name change and the legislation did not pass.

As the Department of the Air and Space Forces

Following the United States Space Force's establishment, calls have been made for the Department of the Air Force to rename itself the Department of the Air and Space Forces to acknowledge the Space Force, similar to calls made for the Department of the Navy to rename itself the Department of the Navy and Marine Corps. SpaceNews reported that a proposed name change was considered in 2018 and in 2019 the Air Force Association also called for renaming the department. In 2022, the Air Force Association renamed itself the Air & Space Forces Association, internally acting on its proposal to reflect the Space Force in the organization's name. In a 2021 article in the Space Force Journal, two Space Force officers also proposed a name change for the department.

Congress has also proposed a variety of name changes within the Department of the Air Force to recognize the Space Force's establishment, including a 2022 proposal by the U.S. Senate to rename the Air National Guard to the Air and Space National Guard and 2020 proposal to rename the Airman's Medal the Air and Space Force Medal, mirroring the Navy and Marine Corps Medal.

Organizational structure

The Department of the Air Force is divided into the Office of the Secretary of the Air Force, which is led by the United States Secretary of the Air Force, the Air Staff which is led by the Chief of Staff of the Air Force, and the Space Staff which is led by the Chief of Space Operations.

The Department of the Air Force consists of the United States Air Force and United States Space Force.

Headquarters Department of the Air Force

Secretariat
 Office of the Secretary of the Air Force
 SAF/OS – Secretary of the Air Force
 SAF/US – Under Secretary of the Air Force
 SAF/IA – DUSAF for International Affairs
 SAF/MG – DUSAF for Management
 SAF/AQ – ASAF for Acquisition, Technology & Logistics
 SAF/FM – ASAF for Financial Management & Comptroller
 SAF/IE – ASAF for Installations, Environment & Energy
 SAF/MR – ASAF for Manpower & Reserve Affairs
 SAF/SQ – ASAF for Space Acquisition and Integration
 SAF/AA – Administrative Assistant to the Secretary
 SAF/AG – Auditor General of the Department of the Air Force
 SAF/CN - Deputy Chief Information Officer of the Air Force
 SAF/GC – General Counsel of the Department of the Air Force
 SAF/IG – Inspector General of the Department of the Air Force
 SAF/LL – Legislative Liaison
 SAF/PA – Director of Public Affairs
 SAF/SB – Director of Small Business Programs

Service staffs

Service branches
 Structure of the United States Air Force
 Structure of the United States Space Force

Budget 
The Department of Defense claims the 2019 Department of the Air Force budget is as follows:

*$ in thousands

Numbers May Not Add Due to Rounding

See also
 Structure of the United States Air Force
 Department of the Air Force Police
 Title 32 of the Code of Federal Regulations
 Department of the Air Force Decoration for Exceptional Civilian Service

Notes and references

Bibliography 
 "Airman Magazine: The Book 2010 – Personnel Facts and Figures". Airman Magazine, Volume 54 Number 3

External links
 Official site
 Department of the Air Force in the Federal Register

1947 establishments in the United States
Air Force
United States Air Force
United States Space Force
United States Department of Defense